Paolo Mariotti (born 5 November 1979) is a Sammarinese former footballer who played as a midfielder. He made four appearances for the San Marino national team.

References

Living people
1979 births
Sammarinese footballers
Association football midfielders
San Marino international footballers
S.S. Pennarossa players
S.P. La Fiorita players